Viswamitra  is a 2019 Telugu-language horror thriller film directed by Raj Kiran. The film stars  Nanditha Raj, Prasanna, and Satyam Rajesh.

Cast 
Nanditha Raj as Mitra
Prasanna as K. Gopal C.I., Telangana Police Officer
Satyam Rajesh as Viswa
Ashutosh Rana as A. Rana, Mitra's boss
Vidyullekha Raman as Bujji, Mitra's friend
Jeeva as SML.Vasan C.I.
Satya as Mitra's lover

Production 
Director Raj Kiran announced that he would make a film based on true events that happened in the United States, Switzerland, and New Zealand. Nanditha Raj was roped in to play one of the lead roles. The film was made in a horror genre similar to Raj Kiran's previous films, Geethanjali and Tripura.

Release 
The trailer was released in February 2019. The film was scheduled to release on March 21, but was further delayed to release in May. However, the film released on June 14.

Soundtrack 
Soundtrack was composed by Anup Rubens.
On the Rocks - Pranav Chaganti, Mounika Reddy
Naalo Nenu - Swetha Menon

Release 
123 Telugu said that "On the whole Vishwamitra is a typical horror thriller which lacks the basic flow".

References

External links 

Indian horror thriller films
2010s Telugu-language films
2019 horror thriller films
2019 horror films
2019 films